Benjamin Canham (born 28 June 1997) is an Australian representative rower. He was an U23 world champion in 2019 and has also represented at senior World Championships. He won a bronze medal at the 2022 World Championships.

Club and state rowing
Canham was educated at Brighton Grammar School in Melbourne where he took up rowing. His Australian senior club rowing has been from the Mercantile Rowing Club in Melbourne.  

He first made state selection for Victoria in the 2017 men's youth eight which contested the Noel Wilkinson Trophy at the Interstate Regatta within the Australian Rowing Championships.  In 2021 he moved into the Victorian senior men's eight which contested and won the King's Cup at the Interstate Regatta. Canham also raced in the 2022 Victorian King's Cup eight.

International representative rowing
Canham made his Australian representative debut in a coxed four at the 2019 U23 World Rowing Championships in Sarasota Florida. That crew led their final from start to finish and were crowned as world champions.  
In March 2022 Canham was selected in the Australian training team to prepare for the 2022 international season and the 2022 World Rowing Championships.  He rowed in the three seat of the Australian men's eight to silver medal placings at both of the World Rowing Cups in 2022. At the 2022 World Rowing Championships at Racize, Canham rowed in the four seat of the eight. The crew won through their repechage to make the A final where they raced to a third place and a World Championship bronze medal.

References

External links

1997 births
Living people
Australian male rowers
People educated at Brighton Grammar School
World Rowing Championships medalists for Australia
21st-century Australian people
Rowers from Melbourne